Poovathur (Pudhunagar) is a village in the Orathanadu taluk of Thanjavur district, Tamil Nadu, India.

Demographics 

As per the 2001 census, Poovathur (Pudhunagar) had a total population of 1028 with 482 males and 586 females. The sex ratio was 1133. The literacy rate was 68.53.

References 

 

Villages in Thanjavur district